The Supreme Court of Oklahoma is a court of appeal for non-criminal cases, one of the two highest judicial bodies in the U.S. state of Oklahoma, and leads the judiciary of Oklahoma, the judicial branch of the government of Oklahoma.

The Oklahoma Supreme Court meets in the Oklahoma Judicial Center, having previously met in the Oklahoma State Capitol until 2011. The court consists of nine justices nominated by a state commission and appointed by the governor.

Members of the court are required to be nonpartisan and are prohibited from a number of political activities including making or soliciting campaign contributions.

History

The Oklahoma Supreme Court was created by the ratification of the Oklahoma Constitution in 1907.

After the construction on the Oklahoma State Capitol, which was completed in 1917, the Oklahoma Supreme Court offices and chamber were housed in the building. Plans to move the offices began in 2006. In 2011, the Oklahoma Supreme Court moved its offices from the Oklahoma State Capitol to the Oklahoma Judicial Center.

Composition
The court consists of a chief justice, a vice-chief justice, and seven associate justices, who are nominated by the Oklahoma Judicial Nominating Commission and are appointed by the governor. After appointment, the justices serve until the next general state election. At that time, they must face a retention election. If retained, they begin a six-year term. After their first term, justices must file for direct election by the people of Oklahoma to retain their position.

The Oklahoma Constitution specifies the size of the Oklahoma Supreme Court; however, it also grants the state legislature the power to change the number of justices by statute. According to Article VII, section 2, of the Oklahoma Constitution, the court shall consist of nine justices, one justice from each of the nine judicial districts of the state.

Qualification, appointment process and tenure
Each justice, at the time of election or appointment, must be at least thirty years old, a registered voter in the Supreme Court judicial district they represent for at least one year before filing for the position and a licensed practicing attorney or judge (or both) in Oklahoma for five years before appointment. The potential justice must maintain certification as an attorney or judge while in office in order to remain in their position.

Qualified nominees must submit their names to the Oklahoma Judicial Nominating Commission to verify that they will serve if appointed. In the event of a vacancy on the court, after reviewing potential justices, the commission must submit three names to the governor, of whom the governor appoints one to the Supreme Court to serve until the next general state election. If the governor fails to appoint a justice within sixty days, the chief justice may appoint one of the nominees, who must certify their appointment to the Oklahoma Secretary of State.

Elected justices serve six years in office with a term beginning on the second Monday in January following the general election. Justices appointed to fill vacancies take office immediately and continue to serve in their appointed posts until the next general election. To be eligible to stand for reelection, justices must, within sixty days before the general election, submit their desire to stand for reelection to the Secretary of State.

The justice is then put to election by the people of Oklahoma. If the majority votes to maintain the justice, the justice will serve for another six-year term. However, if the justice declines reelection or the voters vote the justice down, the seat on the Supreme Court shall be considered vacant at the end of the current term and the Judicial Nominating Commission must search for a potential replacement. Justices who have failed to file for reelection or were not retained by the people in the general election are not eligible to immediately succeed themselves.

Retention in office may be sought for successive terms without limit as to number of years or terms served in office.

Jurisdiction and powers
Section 4 of Article VII of the Oklahoma Constitution outlines the jurisdiction of the Supreme Court of Oklahoma. The appellate jurisdiction of the Supreme Court is co-extensive with that of the state's borders. The court's jurisdiction applies to all cases "at law and in equity," except criminal cases, in which the Oklahoma Court of Criminal Appeals has exclusive appellate jurisdiction. If there is a conflict in determining which court has jurisdiction, the Oklahoma Supreme Court is granted the power to determine which court has jurisdiction, with no appeal from the court's determination.

Along with Texas, Oklahoma is one of two states to have two courts of last resort; the Oklahoma Supreme Court decides only civil cases, and the Oklahoma Court of Criminal Appeals decides criminal cases. The Oklahoma Supreme Court has only immediate jurisdiction with respect to new first-impression issues, important legal issues, and cases of great public interest. In addition to appeals from the trial courts, the Oklahoma Supreme Court has jurisdiction over all lower courts, excluding the Oklahoma Court on the Judiciary, and the Oklahoma Senate, when that body is sitting as a Court of Impeachment. Judgments of the Oklahoma Supreme Court with respect to the Oklahoma Constitution are considered final.

The court's authority includes the power to temporarily reassign judges. The Oklahoma Supreme Court also maintains the power to appoint an administrative director and staff. The director serves at the pleasure of the court to assist the chief justice in his administrative duties and to assist the Oklahoma Court on the Judiciary when it calls upon the office's administrative powers.

The court has the power to issue, hear and determine writs of habeas corpus, mandamus, quo warranto, certiorari, prohibition and other remedial writs provided in statute and can be given further authority through statute. A justice of the court can issue the writ of habeas corpus to individuals held in custody if petitioned. Writs can be made to appear before any judge in the state.

Aside from hearing cases, the court is also responsible for administering the state's entire judicial system, establishing rules of operation for the state's other courts. The Oklahoma Supreme Court formulates the rules for the practice of law, which govern the conduct of attorneys, and it administers discipline in appropriate cases. Many of the justices make personal appearances to speak to members of the bar, civic clubs, and educational groups. These appearances are made to help citizens understand the court's workings and decision-making process. Justices are also called upon to administer official oaths of office to public officials.

Ethics restrictions
Judicial officers are charged with maintaining the integrity and independence of the judiciary. Justices are required to be nonpartisan and are prohibited from using their office or powers to promote or assist any private interest. Justices may not hold offices in political parties, make speeches for candidates, or contribute to campaigns for political office.

Justices are also forbidden from campaigning for their own re-election unless there is active opposition to their retention in office. Even if justices or judges are actively campaigning for retention, they can not personally raise funds for their campaign.

Membership

Current justices
The Justices of the Oklahoma Supreme Court are:

This graphical timeline depicts the length of each current Supreme Court justice's tenure (but not seniority) on the Court:

Chief Justice

The Chief Justice of the Oklahoma Supreme Court is the highest ranking judicial officer in the State and is tasked with administering the state judiciary. Unlike the Supreme Court of the United States where one justice is specifically appointed to be chief, the office of Chief Justice rotates among the justices. The justice elect from among their members a chief justice and a vice chief justice to serve a two-year term. There are no term limits or age restrictions on the position.

The Senior Justice of the Oklahoma Supreme Court is the current serving justice with the longest tenure on the Court. As most of the day-to-day activities of the Court are based upon seniority of the justices, the position is the third highest ranking on the Court, behind the Chief Justice and the Vice Chief Justice. As the role of Chief Justice rotates among the justices, the Senior Justice represents the institutional memory of the Court.

Retired justices
There are currently six living retired justices of the Oklahoma Supreme Court: Daniel J. Boudreau, Steven W. Taylor, Joseph M. Watt, Patrick Wyrick, John Reif, and Tom Colbert.  As retired justices, they no longer participate in the work of the Supreme Court.

Seating
Many of the internal operations of the Court are organized by seniority of justices, with the chief justice is considered the most senior member of the court followed by the vice-chief justice, regardless of the length of their service. The other justices are then ranked by the length of their service. During the sessions of the Court, the justices sit according to seniority, with the Chief Justice in the center, the Vice-Chief Justice to chief's immediate right, and the most senior Justice to the chief's immediate left. The remaining justices alternate sides, with the most junior justice being to the chief's furthest left.

As of July 26, 2021, with the retirement of Justice Tom Colbert, from the perspective of the audience, the justices sit as follows:

Succession of seats

The court has nine seats for active justices, numbered in the order in which they were filled. Justices who retire have no role in the operations of court except as authorized by the court itself. That seat is filled by the next justices appointed by the governor.

Timeline of justices

Since 1968
Beginning in 1968 with an amendment to the Oklahoma Constitution approved in 1967, seats on the Supreme Court ceased being filled by partisan election and instead were filled by non-partisan appointment by the Governor of Oklahoma upon nomination by the Oklahoma Judicial Nominating Commission. Justices serve until the next general election following their appointment at which they are retained or rejected. If retained, they serve for an additional six-years until the next retention election.

Note 1: 
Note 2: 
Note 3: 
Bar key: 
 Democrat appointee Republican appointee

Current court
The Kauger Court is the time since 2011 during which the Oklahoma Supreme Court has been led by Senior Justice Yvonne Kauger, who was appointed by Governor George Nigh in 1984. Justice Kauger assumed the role of Senior Justice upon the retirement of Justice Rudolph Hargrave.

Note: 
Bar key: 
 George Nigh appointeeDavid Walters appointee Frank Keating appointee Brad Henry appointee Mary Fallin appointee Kevin Stitt appointee

Notable cases

Prescott v. Oklahoma Capitol Preservation Commission

In Prescott v. Oklahoma Capitol Preservation Commission, Oklahoma citizens challenged the placement of a Ten Commandments Monument on the grounds of the Oklahoma State Capitol under Article 2, Section 5 of the Oklahoma Constitution. The Court ruled, "We hold that the Ten Commandments Monument violates Article 2, Section 5 of the Oklahoma Constitution, is enjoined, and shall be removed". The 7–2 ruling overturns a decision by a district court judge who determined the monument could stay. It prompted calls by a handful of Republican lawmakers for impeachment of the justices who said the monument must be removed. Since the original monument was erected in 2012, several other groups have asked to put up their own monuments on the Capitol grounds. Among them is a group that wants to erect a 7-foot-tall statue that depicts Satan as Baphomet, a goat-headed figure with horns, wings and a long beard. A Hindu leader in Nevada, an animal rights group, and the Church of the Flying Spaghetti Monster also have made requests.

References

External links 
Oklahoma Supreme Court official homepage
 Oklahoma State Courts Network

 
1907 establishments in Oklahoma